Byron Bay High School is a government-funded co-educational comprehensive secondary day school, located in Byron Bay, New South Wales, Australia. The school, which is designed in the shape of a nautilus shell, opened on 15 May 1987. Facilities of the school include: agriculture centre, basketball courts, canteen, car park, changing rooms, library, multi-purpose centre, performing arts centre, sports centre and sports pitch.

Notable alumni
Anatole Serret — drummer of Parcels
Beau Walker — professional surfer and television presenter
Cleopatra Coleman — actress and model, appeared in The Last Man on Earth and In the Shadow of the Moon
Dinesh Palipana  — doctor, legal professional and disability advocate
Eka Darville — actor, appeared in Power Rangers RPM and Jessica Jones
Hayley McGlone — singer and lead vocalist of The Jezabels
Heather Shannon — keyboardist and pianist of The Jezabels
Katherine Hicks — actress, appeared in Rescue: Special Ops
Marty Mayberry — para-alpine skier, competed at the 2006 and 2010 Winter Paralympics
Nathan Baggaley — sprint canoeist and surfskier, competed at the 2004 Summer Olympics
Parkway Drive — metalcore band
Samuel Lockwood — guitarist of The Jezabels
Stan Walker — singer, winner of Australian Idol in 2009
Jake Duncombe — professional skateboarder
Egg — ten time mosh champion and channel nine TV personality

See also

List of government schools in New South Wales
List of schools in the Northern Rivers and Mid North Coast
Education in Australia

References

External links

1987 establishments in Australia
Byron Bay, New South Wales
Educational institutions established in 1987
Public high schools in New South Wales